Morgan Park Raceway is a motorsports complex located at Old Stanthorpe Road near Warwick, in Queensland, Australia and is operated by the Warwick District Sporting Car Club Inc. The venue features a race circuit with five different layouts.

The initial  race circuit was constructed in 1968 and the first race meeting was staged in March of the following year. In 2007 it hosted its first national championship races, the Formula Vee Nationals and the Australian Improved Production Nationals.

The new  layout was first used on the weekend of 14–15 August 2010 for a round of the Shannons Nationals Motor Racing Championships. This meeting featured a round of Australia's oldest motor racing championship, the Australian Drivers' Championship, which was visiting Morgan Park for the first time.

The raceway features sprint events, WDSCC Southern Downs Challenge and Queensland Super Sprint Championships, as well as being the home of the Queensland state championships for motor racing The circuit is also home to Queensland's biggest historic motor racing festival held in July or August, hosted by the Historic Racing Car Club of Queensland. The raceway is also an event round for the Australian Superbike Championship as well as club level racing for both cars and motorcycles. It is also widely known as the home track of Porsche Factory Driver Matt Campbell.

Available circuits 

Not shown:
"Circuit A"
"Circuit C"

Existing circuits have only temporary names with permanent names chosen by fans.

Lap Records

As of August 2022, the fastest official race lap records at Morgan Park Raceway are listed as:

References

External links
Official site
 Morgan Park action will be filmed for TV
Google Map
Morgan Park Raceway - Current Lap Record

Morgan Park Raceway
Morgan Park Raceway
Morgan Park Raceway